The cube root law is an observation in political science that the number of members of a unicameral legislature, or the lower house of a bicameral legislature, is about the cube root of the population being represented. The rule was devised by Rein Taagepera in his 1972 paper "The size of national assemblies".

The law has led to a proposal to increase the size of the United States House of Representatives so that the number of representatives would be the cube root of the US population as calculated in the most recent census. The House of Representatives has had 435 members since the Reapportionment Act of 1929 was passed; if the US followed the cube root rule, there would be 693 members of the House of Representatives based on the population at the 2020 Census. 

This proposal was endorsed by the New York Times editorial board in 2018.

Subsequent analysis 

It has been claimed by Giorgio Margaritondo that the experimental data, including the dataset originally used by Taagepera in 1972, actually fits better to a function with a higher exponent, and that there is sufficient deviation from the cube root rule to question its usefulness. In this regard, analysis by Margaritondo gives an optimal formula of: , where A is the size of the assembly, P is the population, and E = 0.45±0.03.

Applying this formula to the U.S. House Of Representatives as of the 2020 Census would give a House of between 379 and 1231 members, while using an exponent of 0.4507 gives 693 (the same result using the cube root rule).

Table comparing OECD nations in 2019

Historical US House sizes
The following table describes how the US House of Representatives would have looked historically under the cube root rule.

See also
List of legislatures by number of members
United States congressional apportionment
Wyoming Rule
Apportionment in the European Parliament

References

Electoral reform in the United States
United States House of Representatives
United States Electoral College
United States congressional districts
Voting theory